Juliana Felisberta da Silva (born 22 July 1983) is a Brazilian female beach volleyball player who won the silver medal in the women's beach team competition at the 2005 Beach Volleyball World Championships in Berlin, Germany and the 2009 Beach Volleyball World Championships in Stavanger, Norway, partnering Larissa França. At the 2011 Beach Volleyball World Championships they won the gold medal.  At the 2012 Summer Olympics, they won the bronze medal.

Playing partners
 Larissa França
 Jackie Silva
 Maria Antonelli

References

 Juliana Felisberta at the Beach Volleyball Database

1983 births
Living people
Brazilian women's beach volleyball players
Beach volleyball blockers
Beach volleyball players at the 2012 Summer Olympics
Olympic beach volleyball players of Brazil
Olympic medalists in beach volleyball
Olympic bronze medalists for Brazil
Medalists at the 2012 Summer Olympics
Beach volleyball players at the 2007 Pan American Games
Beach volleyball players at the 2011 Pan American Games
Pan American Games gold medalists for Brazil
Portuguese people of Brazilian descent
Sportspeople from Santos, São Paulo
Sportspeople from São Paulo
University of São Paulo alumni
Pan American Games medalists in volleyball
FIVB World Tour award winners
Medalists at the 2011 Pan American Games